Diom Roméo Saganash (born October 28, 1961) is a Cree lawyer and former politician from Canada. Saganash served as the member of Parliament (MP) for Abitibi—Baie-James—Nunavik—Eeyou in Quebec from 2011 to 2019. A member of the New Democratic Party (NDP), he was first elected to the House of Commons in the 2011 federal election and was re-elected in the 2015 federal election. He did not run in 2019.

Early life and education
Saganash was born on October 28, 1961 in Waswanipi, a native community in Quebec. At the age of seven, he was among 27 Cree children taken from their homes to attend a French-language residential school in La Tuque, where he lived with an English-speaking Anglican family. The program was cancelled the following year, but he remained there for ten years, completing his schooling in French. After that, he attended a meeting on the negotiations between the Cree and government officials on constitutional and resource rights, which sparked his interest in pursuing a law degree. He attended law school at the Université du Québec à Montréal and in 1989 he became the first Cree to receive a law degree in Quebec. Saganash is fluent in Cree, French and English.

Political career

In 1985, Saganash founded the Cree Nation Youth Council. He was the Deputy Grand Chief to The Grand Council of the Crees of James Bay from 1990 to 1993, and he later became director of Quebec relations and international affairs for over ten years. From 1997 to 2000, Saganash chaired the James Bay Advisory Committee on the Environment.

As a prominent Cree figure in a riding with many Indigenous peoples, Saganash received personal support from NDP Quebec lieutenant Tom Mulcair, who referred to Saganash as a "very important candidate". He was elected in the 2011 federal election to represent Abitibi—Baie-James—Nunavik—Eeyou. He was one of 59 NDP MPs elected for Quebec ridings (all newcomers except Mulcair), and the party overall achieved its best showing in a federal election to date by becoming Official Opposition to the Conservative government, which rose from minority to majority standing.

On September 16, 2011, Saganash announced that he was running for the leadership of the NDP, to succeed Jack Layton, who had died the previous month. He is believed to be the first Indigenous person to run for the leadership of a major Canadian party. He withdrew on February 9, 2012, however, citing illness in his family and a lack of confidence in his campaign. On March 7, 2012, Saganash announced that he would support Mulcair for NDP leader.

After an incident where he was removed from an Air Canada Jazz flight from Montreal to Val-d'Or for intoxication, Saganash took sick leave in October 2012 for the treatment of alcohol dependency. Saganash cited the death of his "friend and mentor" Jack Layton, as well as the "profound scars" he received while in the residential school system, as the reasons for his dependency. He completed his treatment in November 2012, and returned for the start of the House's first session of 2013.

In the 2015 Canadian federal election, Saganash was re-elected to a second term. The NDP fell from second to third in the seat count nationally, behind the new Liberal majority government and the Conservatives.

In the 2017 NDP leadership election, Saganash supported Niki Ashton.

By July 2018, Saganash had decided not to run in the 43rd Canadian federal election, which took place in 2019.

Electoral record

|align="left" colspan=2|New Democratic Party gain from Bloc Québécois
|align="right"|Swing
|align="right"| +29.11
|align="right"|

See also
2012 New Democratic Party leadership election

References

External links 
 

Leadership campaign website

1961 births
First Nations activists
First Nations politicians
Lawyers in Quebec
Living people
Members of the House of Commons of Canada from Quebec
New Democratic Party MPs
People from Eeyou Istchee (territory)
Université du Québec à Montréal alumni
Indigenous Members of the House of Commons of Canada
20th-century First Nations people
21st-century First Nations people
Cree people
21st-century Canadian politicians